It is thought that multiple ethnic groups in South Africa have long-standing beliefs concerning gender roles, and most are based on the premise that women in South Africa are less important, or less deserving of power, than men. Some view African traditional social organizations as male centered and male dominated. One prevailing caricature of Afrikaner religious beliefs includes a strong emphasis on the theoretically biblically based notion that women's contributions to society should normally be approved by, or be on behalf of, men. Claims are even made of modern sexism and Christianity being introduced into South Africa by the ancestors of the Afrikaner diaspora.

20th century economic and political developments presented South African women with both new obstacles and new opportunities to wield influence. For example, labor force requirements in cities and mining areas have often drawn men away from their homes for months at a time, and, as a result, women have borne many traditionally male responsibilities in the village and home. Women have had to guarantee the day-to-day survival of their families and to carry out financial and legal transactions that otherwise would have been reserved for men.

History
Women's movement in South Africa began with the organization of the Women's Christian Temperance Union of the Cape Colony (WCTU) in 1889. The temperance movement supported women's suffrage because of the conviction that women would vote to ban or restrict alcohol. In 1911 the Women's Enfranchisement Association of the Union was founded, and in 1930 women's suffrage was granted to white women.

Women and Apartheid
Apartheid imposed new restrictions on African women beginning in the 1950s. Many lived in squalor in the former homelands, where malnutrition, illness, and infant mortality were much higher than in urban areas. Other women who followed their husbands into cities or mining areas lived in inadequate, and often legal, many women are forced to do house work and housing near industrial compounds. Women often left their own families to commute long distances to plow-wage jobs in the domestic work force in white neighborhoods. Substantial numbers were temporary workers in agriculture; and a growing number of women joined the burgeoning industrial work force, as has been carefully researched in Iris Berger's 'Threads of Solidarity: Women in South African Industry', 1900-1990.

Women became the major source of resistance to many race-related restrictions during the apartheid era, especially the pass laws, which required Africans to carry documents permitting them to be in white-occupied areas. The Women's Defence of the Constitution League, later known as the Black Sash, was formed in 1955, first to demonstrate against such laws and later to assist pass-law violators. Black Sash established pass-law advice centers in many cities and helped reduce sentences or assist violators in other ways.

The African National Congress Women's League (ANCWL), formed in 1943, was able to organize more than 20,000 women to march on government buildings in Pretoria to protest against the pass laws and other apartheid restrictions in 1955. Their protests eventually failed, however. In the early 1960s, pass-law restrictions were extended to women and new legislation restricted black women without steady employment to stays of no more than seventy-two hours in any urban area. Also in 1964, many senior ANC leaders were arrested, and others fled from South Africa or went underground, and the ANCWL became almost defunct.

Women continued to join the urban work force, and by the late 1980s, women made up at least 90 percent of the domestic work force and 36 percent of the industrial work force, according to labor union estimates. However, as with the rest of the world, women's wages were lower than men's even for the same job, positions normally held by women had long hours and few benefits, e.g. sick leave; women often were dismissed without advance notice and without any type of termination pay.

Conservative Afrikaner women have organized in support of Afrikaner cultural preservation and apartheid since the 1970s. The Kappiekommando was established in the late 1970s to demand a return to traditional Afrikaner values. This organization was named for its distinctive Voortrekker dress, which caused some young Afrikaners and others to ridicule its members' appearance and their militancy. The Kappiekommando's militant opposition to political reforms eventually contributed to its marginalization, even among staunchly conservative Afrikaners.

The Afrikanervroue-Kenkrag (AVK), another Afrikaner women's organization, was formed in 1983 and worked primarily to oppose racial integration in schools and other public places. AVK membership grew to about 1,000 during the mid-1980s. The group published a monthly newsletter and cooperated with other Afrikaner organizations, but like the Kappiekommando, the AVK lost support when mainstream Afrikaner political leaders began working toward racial inclusiveness in the 1990s.

Women in the 1990s and 2000s

The ANCWL was resurrected in 1990, after the ban on the ANC was lifted, and women in more than 500 towns and cities organized to press for consideration of gender issues in the upcoming constitutional negotiations. At the insistence of its Women's League, the ANC accepted, in principle, the proposal that women should receive one-third of the political appointments in the new government. Other symbolic gains by the ANCWL have included strong policy stands on women's rights and protection against abuse and exploitation, but translating these standards into enforceable laws proved to be a difficult task.

Women are achieving new prominence in politics as a result of the sweeping political reforms of the 1990s. In 1994 women won election to eighty of the 400 seats in the National Assembly, the only directly elected house of parliament, and a woman, Frene Ginwala, was elected Speaker of the National Assembly. Women also were elected to almost one-third of the seats in the nine provincial assemblies.

Nelson Mandela as president appointed two women cabinet ministers in May 1994, and a woman succeeded the late minister of housing, Joe Slovo, after his death in January 1995. Three women were deputy ministers in early 1995. One of these, President Mandela's former wife, Winnie Mandela, was appointed deputy minister of arts, culture, science, and technology.

Eliminating violence against women and improving educational opportunities for women are almost universally supported goals in South Africa in the mid-1990s, but these goals receive only rhetorical support, in many cases. More urgent priorities are to eliminate the vestiges of apartheid legislation and to improve economic and social conditions for the very poor, for children, and for other groups that were especially disadvantaged in recent decades. Gender-related inequalities appeared likely to be decried, but relegated to secondary importance, well into the 21st century.

Marriage and family life

Until the late 20th century, married women's rights remained restricted by law. The family law has changed gradually throughout the 20th century, with white women being the first to gain rights, and black women in customary marriages being the last. Marriage law has, for most of the 20th century, been based on the Roman-Dutch law concept of marital power of the husband, a doctrine in terms of which a wife was legally an  under the usufruct tutorship of her husband. The marital power included the power of the husband to administer both his wife's separate property and their community property. A wife was not able to leave a will, enter into a contract, or sue or be sued, in her own name or without the permission of her husband. The report of the Women's Legal Disabilities Commission in 1949 led to the enacting of the Matrimonial Affairs Act in 1953, which improved the legal status of wives by restricting the marital power, but it did not abolish it. The Matrimonial Property Act of 1984 abolished it prospectively (i.e. for marriages contracted after the act came into force) but not for marriages between black people. An amendment in 1988 abolished it prospectively for marriages of black people under the civil law, but not for marriages contracted under customary law. A further amendment in 1993 repealed the marital power for all civil marriages, whenever they were contracted. The marital power persisted, however, in the Transkei (which was nominally independent from 1976 to 1994) but it was held to be unconstitutional for civil marriages by the High Court in 1999. In 2000, when it came into force, the Recognition of Customary Marriages Act, 1998 abolished the marital power for all marriages under customary law throughout South Africa. Other important changes enacted by 20th century legislation include abolishing the concept of restitution of conjugal rights by the Divorce Act, 1979 (Act No. 70 of 1979), Section 14, as well as enacting several specific laws against domestic violence in the 1990s (see Domestic violence in South Africa). South Africa outlawed marital rape in 1993. The 21st century has seen different conceptions about marriage: in 2006, South Africa became the fifth country in the world to allow same-sex marriage.

In South Africa, the practice of marriage by abduction, is known under the name of ukuthwala, and is the custom of abducting young girls and forcing them into marriage, often with the consent of their parents. This practice occurs mainly in rural areas, in particular the Eastern Cape and KwaZulu-Natal. The girls who are victims of this practice are frequently underage.

Status of women and girls

In 2015, the UN General Assembly (UNGA), SABC and ONE launched the Strong Girl Campaign with the aim of engaging South Africans on the importance of South African government putting women and girls at the center of their UNGA commitments where new development goals would be agreed on. The UNGA discussed the new Sustainable Development Goals (SDGs), which would direct world development efforts for the next 15 years. The South African government has produced a number of policies and legislation in pursuit of women’s empowerment. For instance, the Constitution includes Section 9 which promotes equality for all persons and freedom from discrimination and the Employment Equity Act, No 55 (1998) which strives to achieve equality in the workplace by promoting fair treatment in employment. The status of women in South Africa remains to be complicated so far but thanks to the UN and the South African government, some improvements have been made though despite the improvements, there is still so much more which still need for more investments in programs to empower women and girls so as to improve their status and opportunities.

Sexual violence

The rate of sexual violence in South Africa is among the highest in the world. In 1993 South Africa outlawed marital rape. The Criminal Law (Sexual Offences and Related Matters) Amendment Act, 2007 is a comprehensive legal act, which prohibits and punishes sexual violence. Despite the strong legal framework, sexual violence is very common in South Africa; in one study one in four men admitted to having committed rape. It is estimated that there are about 600,000 rape victims per year in the country. Most cases are not reported to authorities. In South Africa, the virgin cleansing myth is still prevalent, leading to high rates of child sexual abuse.
During 2015/16, there were 51,895 crimes of a sexual nature reported to the South African Police Service.

In September 2019, on the third day of protests, Cyril Ramaphosa, the president of South Africa, disclosed the violence against women in his country as national crisis.

In 2018 alone, the number of women murdered in South Africa reached 3.000.

Reproductive health and rights

Social constructions and expectations play an important role in the South African women’s sexual activity, sexual health and her vulnerability to STI exposure.

Sexually transmitted infections (STIs) are of major public health concern, especially in developing countries where the risk of  transmission of human immunodeficiency virus (HIV) are high. HIV/AIDS in South Africa is a very serious problem. The country has the fourth global rate of infection: in 2016, 18.90% of adults 15–49 years old were living with HIV/AIDS. Only Swaziland, Lesotho and Botswana have a higher rate. Women are much more likely to be infected. Among women, it has been found that it is older South African women who are married or cohabiting with a partner who are of the highest risk group for HIV exposure. A study has concluded that this is a result of an inequitable power of balance between men and women which leaves women, who have less power in the relationship, unable to request nor negotiate condom use with their partners.

In an article from the World Health Organization experts looked at data to present estimates of the prevalence, on any given day, of STIs among women in rural South Africa and the proportion who are asymptomatic, symptomatic but not seeking care, and symptomatic and seeking care. The study found that the majority of women with STIs in South Africa remained untreated because either women were did not present obvious symptoms or, even when they did, the symptoms were not recognized nor acted upon. The study concluded that improved case management alone is "therefore unlikely to have a major public health impact. Improving partner treatment and women's awareness of symptoms is essential, while the potential of mass STI treatment needs to be explored".

Data has shown a correlation between the increase in sex education and the decrease of new cases of HIV infections among young women in South Africa, with education on safe sex practices having substantially helped to curb the spread of STI's in general.

A study published in the American Journal of Public Health concluded that safe sex education prior to young people’s engagement in sexual activity – their “sexual debut” – was a major indicator of whether young people engaged in condom use.

Women’s vaginal practices, which include the cleansing, treatment of infections, pampering, and use of beauty products, affects their sexual and reproductive health and susceptibility to STI. A large percentage of women in South Africa engage in intra-vaginal product use, i.e. douching, which increases their chances for HIV infection.

Maternal mortality is one of the lowest in Africa, although still high by global standards. However, in South Africa, there are conflicting reports on the prevalence of maternal and neonatal mortality, derived from both direct and indirect estimation techniques.

South Africa's Constitution recognizes and protects the rights of all citizens to have access to safe, effective, appropriate and affordable reproductive education, contraception and health services. However, there are contradictory laws in place in regards to women’s ability to engage in sexual practices and receive sexual healthcare services. For example, the age of consent in South Africa for women is 16, with the law requiring mandatory reporting of youths engaged in underage sex. However, girls may legally request birth control from medical centers at age 12. Due to the contradictory and confusing nature of such legislation the sexual health services and education given to young women in South Africa is limited by the health care practitioners understanding of the laws and their individual judgments of how to proceed.

Contraceptive use amount young South Africans aged 15 to 24 is low and consequently the rate of unwanted pregnancies reported among young women are high. A study of contraceptive use and pregnancy among South African women found that 65% of pregnancies in this age group were premarital and unplanned. And a 1988 South Africa Demographic and Health Survey found that 35% of all teenagers had either been pregnant or had given birth by the age of 19.

Types of contraceptives used by South African women are racially stratified with South African women of color predominantly utilizing contraceptive injections.

South Africa is also one of the few countries in Africa to have a liberal abortion law: under the Choice on Termination of Pregnancy Act, 1996, abortion is allowed on request during the first trimester of pregnancy, and in special circumstances at later stages. However, this does not mean that it is easy to get an abortion in South Africa, as not all health care facilities are equally nor adequately equipped to meet the demands for abortion services. As of January 2013 it has been said that it is often cheaper and quicker to get an illegal abortion than to navigate official channels to get a legal abortion.

Social stigmas surrounding abortion, contraception use, and sexual activity among young women and teens are still strong and limit young South African women's ability to access and utilize reproductive health services that are guaranteed to them by their government. This issue is compounded by the fact that while women have the right to free abortions the government only covers the cost of the abortion procedures, but not the cost of maintaining a dedicated staff or facilities out of which abortions can be performed.

See also
 Feminism in South Africa
 Domestic violence in South Africa
 History of women's rights in South Africa

References

 (Data as of 1996.)

External links 

 
South Africa